This list of the mountains and hills in North Rhine-Westphalia shows a selection of high or well-known mountains and hills in the German state of North Rhine-Westphalia (in order of height).

Highest points of the North Rhine-Westphalian provinces 
The following table gives the highest hill or point in the five provinces (Regierungsbezirke) of North Rhine-Westphalia.

By clicking on the word "List" in the "Lists" column you will be taken to a list of other hills in the respective region or hill range (some of which lie partly outside of North Rhine-Westphalia}. The table is listed in order of height, but can be sorted by other columns by clicking on the symbol at the head.

The highest point in the Province of Detmold is on the flank of the Totenkopf in the Sauerland near Bad Wünnenberg.

Highest points of the North Rhine-Westphalian regions 

In the following table are the highest mountains and hills in the various North Rhine-Westphalian landscapes (regions or hill ranges). 

In the "Landscape" column, major hill ranges are shown in bold and landscape units that have no significant local high point or are basins, whose (sometimes island-like) high points have some isolation, are shown in italics. Clicking "List" in the rows of the "List" column links to other hills or mountains in that landscape – some of which are outside of North Rhine-Westphalia. The table is arranged by height, but may be sorted by other criteria by clicking the symbol of the desired column.

List of mountains and hills 

Name, Height in metres above NN, Location  (district/landscape); three "???" means unknown or not researched; please complete!

 Langenberg (843.2 m), North Rhine-Westphalia/Hesse, Hochsauerland district and Waldeck-Frankenberg district, Rothaar
 Kahler Asten (841.9 m), Hochsauerland district, Rothaar
 Clemensberg (839.2 m), Hochsauerland district, Rothaar
 Hopperkopf (832.3 m), North Rhine-Westphalia/Hesse, Hochsauerland district and Waldeck-Frankenberg district, Rothaar
 Hunau (817.6 m), Hochsauerland district, Rothaar
 Ziegenhelle (815.5 m), Hochsauerland district, Rothaar
 Wallershöhe (812 m), Hochsauerland district, Rothaar
 Bremberg (809 m), Hochsauerland district, Rothaar
 Hoher Eimberg (806.1 m), North Rhine-Westphalia/Hesse, Hochsauerland district and Waldeck-Frankenberg district 
 Hoppernkopf (805.0 m), North Rhine-Westphalia/Hesse, Hochsauerland district and Waldeck-Frankenberg district, Rothaar
 Hillekopf (804.9 m), Hochsauerland district, Rothaar
 Heikersköpfchen (792.4 m), Hochsauerland district
 Reetsberg (792.2 m), Hochsauerland district, Rothaar
 Öhrenstein (792.1 m), Hochsauerland district, Rothaar
 Nordhelle (Rothaar) (between 790 and 799 m), Mark district, Rothaar
 Schlossberg (790.0 m), Hochsauerland district, Rothaar
 Auf dem Sternrodt (789.4 m), Hochsauerland district, Rothaar
 Sange (788.1 m), Hochsauerland district, Rothaar
 Krutenberg (785.0 m), North Rhine-Westphalia/Hesse, Hochsauerland district and Waldeck-Frankenberg district, Rothaar
 Junge Grimme (782 m), Hochsauerland district, Rothaar
 Dreiskopf (781 m), North Rhine-Westphalia/Hesse, Hochsauerland district and Waldeck-Frankenberg district 
 Kahle Pön (775.3 m), North Rhine-Westphalia/Hesse, Hochsauerland district and Waldeck-Frankenberg district, Rothaar
 Albrechtsberg (768 m), Siegen-Wittgenstein district, Rothaar
 Rimberg (Winterberg) (764.5 m), Hochsauerland district, Rothaar
 Bollerberg (757 m), Hochsauerland district, Rothaar
 Härdler (756 m), Olpe district, Rothaar
 Poppenberg (746 m), Hochsauerland district, Rothaar
 Bastenberg (744.8 m), Hochsauerland district, Sauerland
 Kalied (744.7 m), Hochsauerland district,  Rothaar
 Zwistberg (744 m), Hochsauerland district and Siegen-Wittgenstein district, Rothaar
 Hohe Hessel (743 m), Olpe district, Rothaar
 Auf'm Knoll (738 m), North Rhine-Westphalia/Hesse, Hochsauerland district and Waldeck-Frankenberg district, Rothaar
 Großer Kopf (740 m), Siegen-Wittgenstein district, Rothaar
 Herrloh (733 m), Hochsauerland district, North Rhine-Westphalia, Rothaar
 Stüppel (732 m), Hochsauerland district, Rothaar
 Sperrenberg (725 m), Hochsauerland district, Sauerland 
 Istenberg (721 m), Hochsauerland district, Sauerland 
 Heidkopf (Olsberg) (715.1 m), Hochsauerland district, Rothaar
 Saukopf (715 m), Hochsauerland district, Rothaar
 Rimberg (Schmallenberg) (713 m), Hochsauerland district, Rothaar 
 Kahlenberg (712 m), Hochsauerland district, Rothaar
 Kahleberg (711 m), Hochsauerland district, Rothaar
 Heidkopf (Hallenberg) (703.8 m), Hochsauerland district, Rothaar
 Olsberg (703.2 m), Hochsauerland district, Rothaar
 Beieck (695 m), Hochsauerland district, Sauerland 
 Kompass (Rothaar) (693.9 m), Siegen-Wittgenstein district, Rothaar
 Weißer Stein (692 m / 689 m on the North Rhine-Westphalian side), Euskirchen district, Zitter Forest/North Eifel
 Ebschloh (686.3 m), Siegen-Wittgenstein district, Rothaar
 Westerberg (684.6 m), Olpe district, Rothaar 
 Riemen (678 m), Siegen-Wittgenstein district, Rothaar
 Jagdberg (Netphen) (675.9 m), Siegen-Wittgenstein district, Rothaar
 Oberste Henn (675.9 m), Siegen-Wittgenstein district, Rothaar
 Milfen (670 m), ??? district, Rothaar
 Milsenberg (670 m), Olpe district, Rothaar
 Borberg (669 m), Hochsauerland district, Briloner Höhen
 Nordhelle (Ebbegebirge) (663.3 m), Mark district, Ebbegebirge
 Kleine Bamicke (659.8 m), Hochsauerland district, Rothaar
 Steling (658 m), Aachen district, Rur Eifel
 Wilzenberg (658), Hochsauerland district, Rothaar
 Homert (1) (656 m), Hochsauerland district, Lenne Uplands
 Hoher Wald (655 m), Siegen-Wittgenstein district, Rothaar
 Giller (653.5 m), Siegen-Wittgenstein district, Rothaar
 Schurenstein (650 m), Hochsauerland district, Sauerland 
 Ederkopf (649 m), Siegen-Wittgenstein district, Rothaar 
 Schomberg (648 m), Hochsauerland district, Lenne Uplands
 Rehberg (646 m), Olpe district, Ebbegebirge 
 Aukopf (644.9 m), Siegen-Wittgenstein district, Rothaar
 Stein (644 m), Siegen-Wittgenstein district, Rothaar
 Rammelsberg, Siegen-Wittgenstein district, Rothaar
 Jagdberg (Erndtebrück) (634.5 m), Siegen-Wittgenstein district, Rothaar
 Homberg (630 m), Siegen-Wittgenstein district, Rothaar
 Röhrenspring (629 m), Hochsauerland district, Rothaar
 Hölzenberg (626 m), ??? district, Rothaar
 Lahnkopf (624.9 m), Siegen-Wittgenstein district, Rothaar 
 Bilstein (620 m), Hochsauerland district, Brilon Heights
 Kindelsberg (617.9 m), Siegen-Wittgenstein district, Rothaar
 Nenkersberg (610 m), Siegen-Wittgenstein district, Westerwald 
 Eisenberg (606 m), Hochsauerland district, Brilon Heights
 Kuhelle (603 m), Olpe district, Rothaar
 Rothenstein (600 m), Mark district, Ebbegebirge 
 Iberg (596 m), Hochsauerland district, Sauerland 
 Die Burg, (591 m), Siegen-Wittgenstein, Rothaar / Westerwald
 Michelsberg (588 m), Euskirchen district, Ahr Hills, Eifel 
 Hohe Bracht (587.9 m), Olpe district
 Unnamed peak (581.5 m), near Meschede-Eversbergs, Soest district, Arnsberg Forest
 Wilde Wiese (580 m), Hochsauerland district, Rothaar
 Kalteiche (579.3 m), Siegen-Wittgenstein, Rothaar
 Weiße Frau (572 m), Hochsauerland district, Brilon Heights
 Donnerhain (560 m), Siegen-Wittgenstein district, Rothaar 
 Unnamed peak (559.5 m), near Brilon-Esshofs, ??? district, Arnsberg Forest Nature Park 
 Unnamed peak near the Meschede TV tower (557.4 m), Hochsauerland district, Arnsberg Forest Nature Park
 Warsteiner Kopf (556.9 m), Hochsauerland district, Arnsberg Forest Nature Park 
 Der Griesing (555 m), Mark district, Ebbegebirge 
 Gemeinheitskopf (551.9 m), Hochsauerland district, Arnsberg Forest Nature Park 
 Tiefenrother Höhe (551 m), Siegen-Wittgenstein district, Rothaar
 Unnamed peak (550.8 m), near Meschede and the  "B 55", Hochsauerland district, Arnsberg Forest Nature Park 
 Niekopf (550.4 m), Soest district, Arnsberg Forest Nature Park
 Ebberg (546.9 m), ??? district, Arnsberg Forest Nature Park
 Balve Forest (545.9 m), Mark district, Rothaar
 Ensterknick (543.2 m), Hochsauerland district, Arnsberg Forest Nature Park 
 Nuttlar Heights (Nuttlarer Höhe) (542.2 m), Hochsauerland district, Arnsberg Forest Nature Park 
 Stimm Stamm (541.1 m), Passhöhe, Soest district and Hochsauerland district, Arnsberg Forest Nature Park 
 Homert (2) (539 m), Mark district, Ebbegebirge
 Kahler Kopf (539 m), Mark district, Ebbegebirge 
 Knippberg (537 m), ??? district, Ahr Hills, Eifel
 Heimberg (536 m), Hochsauerland district, Briloner Höhen
 Sengenberg (530.4 m), Soest district, Arnsberg Forest Nature Park 
 Bornstein (529 m), Hochsauerland district, Sauerland 
 Walkersdorfer Berg (526 m), Siegen-Wittgenstein district, Rothaar
 Wildbretshügel (525 m), Euskirchen district/Düren district, Rur Eifel/Kermeter
 Wehberg (525 m), Soest district, Arnsberg Forest Nature Park 
 Liverhagen (522.6 m), Hochsauerland district, Arnsberg Forest Nature Park
 Moosberg (522.0 m), ??? district, Arnsberg Forest Nature Park 
 Voßstein (521.1 m; nordöstlicher Kopf), ??? district, Arnsberg Forest Nature Park 
 Hornscheid (519.7 m), Hochsauerland district, Arnsberg Forest Nature Park 
 Voßstein (519.7 m; mittlerer Kopf), ??? district, Arnsberg Forest Nature Park 
 Homert (3) (519 m), Upper Berg district, Bergisches Land
 Silberkuhle (515 m), Upper Berg district, Bergisches Land
 Greverhagen (514.6 m), Hochsauerland district, Arnsberg Forest Nature Park 
 Kopnück (514 m), Euskirchen district, Ahr Hills, Eifel
 Bautenberg (512.9 m), Siegen-Wittgenstein district, Rothaar
 Voßstein (512.3 m; southwestern peak), ??? district, Arnsberg Forest Nature Park 
 Brandenberg (509.3 m), Soest district, Arnsberg Forest Nature Park 
 Unnenberg (506 m), Marienheide, Upper Berg district, Bergisches Land
 Heinberg (504.9 m), ??? district, Arnsberg Forest Nature Park
 Neuer Berg (504.2 m), ??? district, Arnsberg Forest Nature Park 
 Wennemer Höhe (503.3 m), Hochsauerland district, Arnsberg Forest Nature Park 
 Totenkopf (502.6 m), Hochsauerland district, near Marsberg
 Kohlberg (502 m), Mark district
 Kopf (500.8 m), ??? district, Arnsberg Forest Nature Park
 Blumenkopf (500.7 m), ??? district, Arnsberg Forest Nature Park
 Schaaken (500 m), Hochsauerland district, Briloner Höhen
 Pfannenberg (499.2 m), Siegen-Wittgenstein district, Rothaar
 Suhrenberg (498.2 m), ??? district, Arnsberg Forest Nature Park
 Köterberg (496 m; Monte Wau-Wau), Lippe district, Weser Uplands, border of North Rhine-Westphalia and Lower Saxony 
 Schälhorn (493 m), Hochsauerland district, Brilon Heights
 Kahlenbergsköpfe (485.7 m southern peak), Soest district, Arnsberg Forest Nature Park 
 Schellberg (472 m), Hochsauerland district, Brilon Heights
 Wildenberg (468.7 m), Siegen-Wittgenstein district, Rothaar
 Preußischer Velmerstot (468 m), Paderborn district, Eggegebirge
 Kahlenbergsköpfe (466.9 m mittlerer Kopf), Soest district, Arnsberg Forest Nature Park 
 Tüppel (461 m), Soest district, Arnsberg Forest Nature Park 
 Großer Ölberg (460 m), Rhine-Sieg district, Siebengebirge
 Löwenburg (455 m), Rhine-Sieg district, Siebengebirge 
 Schiffenberg (452.6 m), Siegen-Wittgenstein district, Rothaar
 Hoheloh (451 m), ??? district, Sindfeld
 Kahlenbergsköpfe (447.5 m nördlicher Kopf), Soest district, Arnsberg Forest Nature Park 
 Barnacken (446 m), Lippe district, Teutoburg Forest
 Elkersberg (443.2 m), Siegen-Wittgenstein district, Rothaar
 Kleine Rausche (443.1 m), Siegen-Wittgenstein district, Rothaar
 Wengeberg (442 m), Ennepe-Ruhr district, Breckerfeld, highest elevation in the Ruhr
 Hausheide (441 m), Höxter district, Eggegebirge, near Bad Driburg
 Lippischer Velmerstot (441 m), Lippe district, Eggegebirge
 Große Rausche (436.9 m), Siegen-Wittgenstein district, Rothaar
 Lohrberg (435 m), Rhine-Sieg district, Siebengebirge
 Hirseberg (434 m), ??? district, Sindfeld 
 Hohlestein (433 m), Lippe district, Teutoburg Forest
 Leyenkopf (431.5 m), Siegen-Wittgenstein district, Rothaar
 Padberg (426 m), Lippe district, Teutoburg Forest
 Küppel (422.6 m), ??? district, Arnsberg Forest Nature Park 
 Unnamed peak (285.8 m), near Möhnesee-Delecke, ??? district, Arnsberg Forest Nature Park 
 Langenberg (418 m), Lippe district, Teutoburg Forest
 Püsterberg (410 m), Soest district, Arnsberg Forest Nature Park 
 Stemberg (402 m), Lippe district, Teutoburg Forest 
 Burgberg, (400.5 m), Düren district, North Eifel
 Piusberg (399 m), Soest district, Arnsberg Forest Nature Park 
 Stillenbergskopf (399 m), Soest district, Arnsberg Forest Nature Park
 Markberg (394 m), Lippe district, Teutoburg Forest 
 Sonnenberg (393.3 m), Düren district, Rur Eifel/Hausener Busch
 Bielstein (393 m), Lippe district, Teutoburg Forest
 Spitze Warte (391 m), Soest district, Haarstrang
 Hoher Schaden (388 m), Rhine-Sieg district, Westerwald
 Teutberg (386 m), Lippe district, Teutoburg Forest
 Heckberg (383 m), Rhine-Sieg district, Bergisches Land
 Iburg (380 m), Höxter  district, Eggegebirge, near Bad Driburg
 Brodtberg (378.86 m), Remscheid, Bergisches Land
 Hohes Wäldchen (378 m), Rhine-Sieg district, Bergisches Land
 Stahlseifer Kopf (375.8 m), Siegen-Wittgenstein district, Rothaar
 Butterberg (372 m), Soest district, Arnsberg Forest Nature Park 
 Hellerberg (366.9 m), Siegen-Wittgenstein district, Rothaar
 Hermannsberg (364 m; also called Großer Hermannsberg), Lippe district, Teutoburg Forest
 Eisenberg (361 m), Soest district, Arnsberg Forest Nature Park 
 Lichtscheid (351 m), Wuppertal
 Kleiner Heckberg (348 m), Rhine-Berg district, Bergisches Land
 Wehlhügel (346 m), Soest district, Haarstrang 
 Desenberg (343.6 m), Höxter district, Warburg Börde
 Bonstapel (342 m), Herford district, Weser Uplands
 Großer Ehberg (340 m), ??? district, Teutoburg Forest
 Nonnenstromberg (335 m), Rhine-Sieg district, Siebengebirge
 Tönsberg (333.4 m), Lippe district, Teutoburg Forest
 Petersberg (331 m), Rhine-Sieg district, Siebengebirge
 Scharpenacker Berg (326.3 m), Wuppertal
 Wolkenburg (324 m), Rhine-Sieg district, Siebengebirge
 Drachenfels (321 m), Rhine-Sieg district, Siebengebirge
 Vaalserberg (322.50 m), Germany-Belgium-Netherlands border, Aachen Forest
 Heidbrink (319.6 m), Minden-Lübbecke district, Wiehen Hills
 Hengeberg (316 m), Gütersloh district, Teutoburg Forest
 Große Egge (312 m), Gütersloh district, Teutoburg Forest
 Ebberg / Eiserner Anton (309 m), town of Bielefeld, Teutoburg Forest
 Hankenüll (307 m), Gütersloh district, on the border between Lower Saxony and North Rhine-Westphalia, Teutoburg Forest
 Bußberg (306 m), Gütersloh district, Teutoburg Forest
 Hollandskopf (306 m), Gütersloh district, Teutoburg Forest
 Teutberg (305.3 m), Lippe district
 Hünenburg (302 m), Bielefeld, Teutoburg Forest
 Johannisberg (291 m), Gütersloh district, Teutoburg Forest
 Sophienhöhe (290 m), Düren district, a slag heap
 Nettelstedter Berg (289 m), Minden-Lübbecke district, Wiehen Hills
 Burggrafenberg (282.8 m), Wuppertal, Staatsforst Burgholz
 Wittekindsberg (281.48 m), Porta Westfalica, Wiehen Hills
 Auf dem Heil (274 m), Ennepe-Ruhr district, Ardey Hills
 Nonnenstein (274 m), on the border between Herford and Minden-Lübbecke districts, Wiehen Hills
 Arenberg (269 m), Ennepe-Ruhr district, Witten
 Lousberg (264 m), Aachen
 Lüderich  (260.2 m), Rhine-Berg district
 Klusenberg (254 m), Dortmund, Ardey Hills, highest hill on Dortmund city territory
 Syberg (244 m), Dortmund, Ardey Hills
 Höstreichberg (243 m), Ennepe-Ruhr district
 Höhensteine (236 m), Rhine-Sieg district, Leuscheid
 Böllberg (236 m), Ennepe-Ruhr district
 Westerbecker Berg (236 m), Steinfurt district
 Harkortberg (232 m), Ennepe-Ruhr district, Ardey Hills
 Glessener Höhe (204 m), highest point in Rhein-Erft district, Ville ridge 
 Halde Oberscholven (201.8 m), Gelsenkirchen, Bergehalde
 Ibbenbüren-Dickenberg (201 m) Ibbenbüren Steinfurt district (Bergehalde)
 Unnamed peak (193 m) in Bochum-Stiepel, western extension of the Ardey Hills, highest hill in the city of Bochum
 Maschberg (190.2 m), Herford district
 Ichenberg (190 m), Aachen district	
 Limberg ((190 m), Minden-Lübbecke district	
 Westerberg (187 m), Coesfeld district, Baumberge
 Kaisberg (185 m), Ennepe-Ruhr district
 Brasberg (185 m), Ennepe-Ruhr district
 Stever Berge (182 m), Coesfeld district, Baumberge
 Stemweder Berg (181 m), Minden-Lübbecke district, Stemme Hills	 
 Schafberg (Ibbenbüren) (174 m), Steinfurt district
 Mackenberg (173 m), Warendorf district, Beckum Hills	 
 Rennenberg (164.10 m), Ruppichteroth
 Dörenther Klippen (159 m), Steinfurt district, Teutoburg Forest	 
 Schöppinger Berg (157.6 m), Borken district 
 Stimberg (156 m), Recklinghausen district, the Haard	 
 Halde Großes Holz (150 m), Unna district, Bergehalde
 Waldbeerenberg (146 m), Recklinghausen district, Hohe Mark	
 Bergelerberg (136 m), Warendorf district, Beckum Hills 
 Granatsberg (135 m), Recklinghausen district, Hohe Mark	 
 Fischberg (134 m), ??? district, Borkenberge	 
 Ostenberg (126 m), ??? district, Stemme Hills	
 Halde Haniel (126 m), Bottrop, Bergehalde
 Weseler Berg (126 m), Recklinghausen district, the Haard	 
 Dachsberg (123 m), Recklinghausen district, the Haard	 
 Galgenberg (123 m), Recklinghausen district, Hohe Mark
 Stuckenberg (118 m), Unna district, Unna-Massen	 
 Monte Troodelöh (118 m), Köln, Königsforst	 
 Maiberg (109 m), ??? district, Hohe Mark	 
 Hammerberg (106 m), Recklinghausen district, the Haard	
 Kurricker Berg (102 m), Stadt Hamm in the borough of Bockum-Hövel
 Halde Norddeutschland (102 m), Neukirchen-Vluyn, Bergehalde   
 Tannenbülten (100 m), ??? district, Die Berge	
 Klever Berg (99 m), Kleve district, Kleve
 Michaelsberg (118 m), Rhine-Sieg district
 Inrather Berg (87 m), Krefeld 
 Kapuzinerberg (77 m), Krefeld
 Kaiserberg (75 m), Duisburg
 Fürstenberg (75 m), Xanten
 Oermter Berg (68 m), between Rheurdt and Issum  
 Hülser Berg (63 m), Krefeld

See also 

 List of the highest mountains in Germany
 List of mountain and hill ranges in Germany
 List of hills in the Teutoburg Forest

North Rhine-Westphalia
!
Mount